Naumovka is a rural locality (a selo) and the administrative centre of Naumovsky Selsoviet, Sterlitamaksky District, Bashkortostan, Russia. The population was 2,935 as of 2010. There are 27 streets.

Geography 
Naumovka is located 16 km south of Sterlitamak (the district's administrative centre) by road. Pokrovka is the nearest rural locality.

References 

Rural localities in Sterlitamaksky District